The 2010 IFSC Climbing World Cup was held in 15 locations. Bouldering competitions were held in 7 locations, lead in 6 locations, and speed in 7 locations. The season began on 30 April in Trento, Italy and concluded on 14 November in Kranj, Slovenia.

The top 3 in each competition received medals, and the overall winners were awarded trophies. At the end of the season an overall ranking was determined based upon points, which athletes were awarded for finishing in the top 30 of each individual event.

The winners for bouldering were Adam Ondra and Akiyo Noguchi, for lead Ramón Julián Puigblanqué and Jain Kim, for speed Stanislav Kokorin and Yuliya Levochkina, and for combined Adam Ondra and Jain Kim, men and women respectively.

Highlights of the season 
In bouldering, Adam Ondra of Czech Republic won 3 out of 7 bouldering World Cups and then the overall men's bouldering title of the season, making him the first climber to ever win the overall World Cup titles in lead (2009) and bouldering (2010).

In speed climbing, at the end of the season, Russian athletes, Stanislav Kokorin and Yuliya Levochkina clinched the overall titles of the season for men and women respectively, making it double speed titles for Russia.

Overview

References

External links 

IFSC Climbing World Cup
2010 in sport climbing